This is a List of amphibians of the Democratic Republic of the Congo by family. It lists all families and species of amphibians in the Democratic Republic of the Congo.

The list below follows Frost, 2011: Amphibian Species of the World, an Online Reference. Version 5.5 (31 January 2011), and AmphibiaWeb, by the University of California, Berkeley.

A difference between the two above classifications is that Frost has split the families Dicroglossidae, Phrynobatrachidae, Ptychadenidae, Pyxicephalidae and Rhacophoridae off from the Ranidae (i.e. elevated to distinct families), whereas AmphibiaWeb has not (i.e. keeping them within the Ranidae). In this we follow Frost here.

See Sources below.



Class Amphibia
Total 259 species of Amphibians, in 2 orders, 15 families, 43 genera, in the Democratic Republic of the Congo, a few of which are presumed to occur in DRC but have not yet been found there.

Order Anura - Frogs and Toads
Total 256 species in 14 families, 40 genera, in the Democratic Republic of the Congo.

Family Arthroleptidae - Screeching frogs or squeakers, 46 species in 6 genera in the Democratic Republic of the Congo.
Arthroleptis adolfifriederici (Nieden, 1911)
Arthroleptis hematogaster (Laurent, 1954)
Arthroleptis lameerei (De Witte, 1921)
Arthroleptis loveridgei (De Witte, 1933)
Arthroleptis phrynoides (Laurent, 1976)
Arthroleptis poecilonotus (Peters, 1863)
Arthroleptis pyrrhoscelis (Laurent, 1952)
Arthroleptis schubotzi (Nieden, 1911); includes Arthroleptis discodactylus
Arthroleptis spinalis (Boulenger, 1919)
Arthroleptis stenodactylus (Pfeffer, 1893)
Arthroleptis sylvaticus (Laurent, 1954)
Arthroleptis taeniatus (Boulenger, 1906); presumably in (NW) DRC
Arthroleptis tuberosus (Andersson, 1905)
Arthroleptis variabilis (Matschie, 1893)
Arthroleptis vercammeni (Laurent, 1954)
Arthroleptis xenochirus (Boulenger, 1905)
Arthroleptis xenodactyloides (Hewitt, 1933); probably in (SE) DRC
Astylosternus batesi (Boulenger, 1900)
Cardioglossa cyaneospila (Laurent, 1950)
Cardioglossa escalerae (Boulenger, 1903)
Cardioglossa gracilis (Boulenger, 1900)
Cardioglossa gratiosa Amiet, 1972; presumably in (N) DRC
Cardioglossa leucomystax (Boulenger, 1903)
Leptopelis aubryi (Duméril, 1856)
Leptopelis aubryioides (Andersson, 1907); possibly in (W) DRC
Leptopelis bocagii (Günther, 1865)
Leptopelis boulengeri (Werner, 1898)
Leptopelis calcaratus (Boulenger, 1906)
Leptopelis christyi (Boulenger, 1912)
Leptopelis cynnamomeus (Bocage, 1893)
Leptopelis fenestratus (Laurent, 1972
Leptopelis fiziensis (Laurent, 1973
Leptopelis karissimbensis (Ahl, 1929
Leptopelis kivuensis (Ahl, 1929
Leptopelis lebeaui (De Witte, 1933)
Leptopelis millsoni (Boulenger, 1895)
Leptopelis modestus (Werner, 1898)
Leptopelis notatus (Peters, 1875)
Leptopelis ocellatus (Mocquard, 1902)
Leptopelis oryi (Inger, 1968)
Leptopelis parbocagii (Poynton and Broadley, 1987)
Leptopelis parvus (Schmidt and Inger, 1959)
Leptopelis rufus (Reichenow, 1874)
Leptopelis viridis (Günther, 1869)
Scotobleps gabonicus (Boulenger, 1900)
Trichobatrachus robustus (Boulenger, 1900)
Family Brevicipitidae - sometimes considered a subfamily, Brevicipitinae of the Microhylidae, see below; 2 species in 1 genus in the Democratic Republic of the Congo.
Breviceps mossambicus (Peters, 1854)
Breviceps poweri (Parker, 1934)
Family Bufonidae - True toads, 22 species in 5 genera in the Democratic Republic of the Congo.
Amietophrynus buchneri (Peters, 1882) = Bufo buchneri, presumably in DRC
Amietophrynus camerunensis (Parker, 1936) = Bufo camerunensis
Amietophrynus channingi (Barej & all., 2011) = Bufo channingi
Amietophrynus fuliginatus (De Witte, 1932) = Bufo fuliginatus
Amietophrynus funereus (Bocage, 1866) = Bufo funereus
Amietophrynus gracilipes (Boulenger, 1899) = Bufo gracilipes
Amietophrynus gutturalis (Power, 1927) = Bufo gutturalis
Amietophrynus kisoloensis (Loveridge, 1932) = Bufo kisoloensis
Amietophrynus latifrons (Boulenger, 1900) = Bufo latifrons
Amietophrynus lemairii (Boulenger, 1901) = Bufo lemairii
Amietophrynus maculatus (Hallowell, 1854) = Bufo maculatus
Amietophrynus regularis (Reuss, 1833) = Bufo regularis
Amietophrynus steindachneri (Pfeffer, 1893) = Bufo steindachneri, presumably in DRC
Amietophrynus superciliaris (Boulenger, 1888) = Bufo superciliaris
Amietophrynus tuberosus (Günther, 1858) = Bufo tuberosus
Laurentophryne parkeri (Laurent, 1950)
Mertensophryne melanopleura (Schmidt and Inger, 1959) = Bufo melanopleura
Mertensophryne schmidti (Grandison, 1972) = Bufo schmidti
Mertensophryne taitana (Peters, 1878) = Bufo taitanus
Nectophryne afra (Buchholz and Peters in Peters, 1875)
Nectophryne batesii (Boulenger, 1913)
Schismaderma carens (Smith, 1848)
Family: Dicroglossidae, sometimes considered part of the family Ranidae, see below; 1 species in the Democratic Republic of the Congo.
Hoplobatrachus occipitalis (Günther, 1858)
Family Hemisotidae - Shovelnose frogs, 5 species in 1 genus in the Democratic Republic of the Congo.
Hemisus guineensis (Cope, 1865)
Hemisus marmoratus (Peters, 1854)
Hemisus olivaceus (Laurent, 1963)
Hemisus perreti (Laurent, 1972)
Hemisus wittei (Laurent, 1963)
Family Hyperoliidae - Sedge frogs or bush frogs, 87 species in 11 genera in the Democratic Republic of the Congo.
Acanthixalus spinosus (Buchholz and Peters in Peters, 1875)
Afrixalus "quadrivittatus" Pickersgill, 2007; not A. quadrivittatus, uncertain species, possibly same as A. fulvovittatus or Afrixalus vittiger
Afrixalus dorsalis (Peters, 1875)
Afrixalus equatorialis (Laurent, 1941)
Afrixalus fulvovittatus (Cope, 1861); in Congo? Or limited to West Africa?
Afrixalus laevis (Ahl, 1930)
Afrixalus leucostictus (Laurent, 1950)
Afrixalus orophilus (Laurent, 1947)
Afrixalus osorioi (Ferreira, 1906)
Afrixalus quadrivittatus (Werner, 1908)
Afrixalus upembae (Laurent, 1941)
Afrixalus weidholzi (Mertens, 1938)
Afrixalus wittei (Laurent, 1941)
Alexteroon hypsiphonus (Amiet, 2000); doubtful occurrence in (NW) DRC
Callixalus pictus (Laurent, 1950)
Chrysobatrachus cupreonitens (Laurent, 1951)
Cryptothylax greshoffii (Schilthuis, 1889)
Cryptothylax minutus (Laurent, 1976)
Hyperolius acuticeps (Ahl, 1931); distinct from H. nasutus
Hyperolius adspersus (Peters, 1877)
Hyperolius atrigularis (Laurent, 1941)
Hyperolius balfouri (Werner, 1908)
Hyperolius benguellensis (Bocage, 1893)
Hyperolius bocagei (Steindachner, 1867); uncertain species, possibly same as H. viridiflavus or H. kachalolae
Hyperolius bolifambae Mertens, 1938; doubtful occurrence in (NW) DRC
Hyperolius brachiofasciatus (Ahl, 1931)
Hyperolius castaneus (Ahl, 1931)
Hyperolius chrysogaster (Laurent, 1950)
Hyperolius cinereus (Monard, 1937); probably in (SW) DRC
Hyperolius cinnamomeoventris (Bocage, 1866)
Hyperolius constellatus (Laurent, 1951); distinct from H. castaneus
Hyperolius dartevellei Laurent, 1943
Hyperolius diaphanus (Laurent, 1972)
Hyperolius discodactylus (Ahl, 1931); includes Hyperolius alticola
Hyperolius ferrugineus (Laurent, 1943)
Hyperolius frontalis (Laurent, 1950)
Hyperolius ghesquieri (Laurent, 1943)
Hyperolius glandicolor (Peters, 1878); probably in (E) DRC
Hyperolius hutsebauti (Laurent, 1956)
Hyperolius inornatus (Laurent, 1943)
Hyperolius jacobseni Channing et al., 2013; doubtful occurrence in (NW) DRC
Hyperolius kachalolae (Schiøtz, 1975); probably in (S) DRC
Hyperolius kibarae (Laurent, 1957)
Hyperolius kivuensis (Ahl, 1931); includes Hyperolius raveni
Hyperolius kuligae (Mertens, 1940)
Hyperolius langi (Noble, 1924)
Hyperolius lateralis (Laurent, 1940)
Hyperolius leleupi (Laurent, 1951)
Hyperolius leucotaenius (Laurent, 1950)
Hyperolius lucani (Rochebrune, 1885); doubtful species, probably same as H. ocellatus, doubtful occurrence in (W) DRC
Hyperolius maestus (Rochebrune, 1885); doubtful species, probably same as H. viridiflavus or H. marmoratus, doubtful occurrence in (W) DRC
Hyperolius major (Laurent, 1957)
Hyperolius marginatus (Peters, 1854)
Hyperolius mariae (Barbour and Loveridge, 1928)
Hyperolius marmoratus Rapp, 1842
Hyperolius nasicus (Laurent, 1943)
Hyperolius nasutus (Günther, 1865)
Hyperolius obscurus (Laurent, 1943)
Hyperolius ocellatus (Günther, 1858)
Hyperolius parallelus (Günther, 1858)
Hyperolius pardalis Laurent, 1948; doubtful occurrence in (NW) DRC
Hyperolius phantasticus (Boulenger, 1899)
Hyperolius platyceps (Boulenger, 1900)
Hyperolius polli (Laurent, 1943)
Hyperolius polystictus (Laurent, 1943)
Hyperolius poweri (Loveridge, 1938); probably in (E) DRC
Hyperolius protchei (Rochebrune, 1885); doubtful species, probably same as H. viridiflavus or H. marmoratus, doubtful occurrence in (W) DRC
Hyperolius pustulifer (Laurent, 1940)
Hyperolius quinquevittatus (Bocage, 1866)
Hyperolius rhizophilus (Rochebrune, 1885); doubtful species, doubtful occurrence in (W) DRC
Hyperolius robustus (Laurent, 1979)
Hyperolius rwandae Channing et al., 2013; doubtful occurrence in (E) DRC
Hyperolius sankuruensis (Laurent, 1979)
Hyperolius schoutedeni (Laurent, 1943)
Hyperolius steindachneri (Bocage, 1866)
Hyperolius tuberculatus (Mocquard, 1897)
Hyperolius veithi Schick, Kielgast, Rödder, Muchai, Burger, and Lötters, 2010
Hyperolius vilhenai (Laurent, 1964); probably in (W) DRC
Hyperolius viridiflavus (Duméril and Bibron, 1841)
Hyperolius viridis (Schiøtz, 1975); probably in (SE) DRC
Hyperolius xenorhinus (Laurent, 1972)
Kassina decorata (Angel, 1940)
Kassina kuvangensis (Monard, 1937); probably in (S) DRC
Kassina maculosa (Sternfeld, 1917)
Kassina mertensi (Laurent, 1952)
Kassina senegalensis (Duméril and Bibron, 1841)
Kassinula wittei (Laurent, 1940)
Opisthothylax immaculatus (Boulenger, 1903)
Phlyctimantis leonardi (Boulenger, 1906)
Phlyctimantis verrucosus (Boulenger, 1912)
Family Microhylidae - Narrow-mouthed frogs, 3 species in 1 genus in the Democratic Republic of the Congo.
Phrynomantis affinis Boulenger, 1901
Phrynomantis bifasciatus (Smith, 1847)
Phrynomantis microps Peters, 1875
Family: Petropedetidae, 1 species in the Democratic Republic of the Congo.
Conraua crassipes (Buchholz and Peters in Peters, 1875)
Family Phrynobatrachidae - sometimes considered part of the family Ranidae, see below; 25 species in 1 genus in the Democratic Republic of the Congo.
Phrynobatrachus acutirostris Nieden, 1913
Phrynobatrachus africanus (Hallowell, 1858); possibly in (W) DRC
Phrynobatrachus albomarginatus De Witte, 1933
Phrynobatrachus anotis Schmidt and Inger, 1959
Phrynobatrachus asper Laurent, 1951
Phrynobatrachus auritus Boulenger, 1900
Phrynobatrachus bequaerti (Barbour and Loveridge, 1929)
Phrynobatrachus calcaratus (Peters, 1863); doubtful occurrence in (NW) DRC
Phrynobatrachus congicus (Ahl, 1925); uncertain species, uncertain occurrence in DRC
Phrynobatrachus cryptotis Schmidt and Inger, 1959
Phrynobatrachus dalcqi Laurent, 1952
Phrynobatrachus dendrobates (Boulenger, 1919)
Phrynobatrachus gastoni Barbour and Loveridge, 1928
Phrynobatrachus giorgii De Witte, 1921
Phrynobatrachus graueri (Nieden, 1911)
Phrynobatrachus mababiensis FitzSimons, 1932
Phrynobatrachus natalensis (Smith, 1849)
Phrynobatrachus parkeri De Witte, 1933
Phrynobatrachus parvulus (Boulenger, 1905)
Phrynobatrachus perpalmatus Boulenger, 1898
Phrynobatrachus petropedetoides Ahl, 1924
Phrynobatrachus rouxi (Nieden, 1913); In (Eastern) Congo?
Phrynobatrachus rungwensis (Loveridge, 1932)
Phrynobatrachus scapularis (De Witte, 1933)
Phrynobatrachus versicolor Ahl, 1924
Family Pipidae - Tongueless frogs or clawed frogs, 17 species in 3 genera in the Democratic Republic of the Congo.
Hymenochirus boettgeri (Tornier, 1896)
Hymenochirus boulengeri De Witte, 1930
Hymenochirus curtipes Noble, 1924
Silurana epitropicalis (Fischberg, Colombelli, and Picard, 1982) = Xenopus epitropicalis
Silurana tropicalis Gray, 1864 = Xenopus tropicalis, possibly not in DRC (in DRC being synonymous with Silurana epitropicalis)
Xenopus andrei Loumont, 1983; possibly in (W) DRC
Xenopus fraseri Boulenger, 1905
Xenopus itombwensis Evans, Carter, Tobias, Kelley, Hanner, and Tinsley, 2008
Xenopus laevis (Daudin, 1802)
Xenopus lenduensis Evans, Greenbaum, Kusamba, Carter, Tobias, Mendel, and Kelley, 2011
Xenopus muelleri (Peters, 1844)
Xenopus petersii Bocage, 1895
Xenopus pygmaeus Loumont, 1986
Xenopus ruwenzoriensis Tymowska and Fischberg, 1973
Xenopus vestitus Laurent, 1972
Xenopus victorianus Ahl, 1924
Xenopus wittei Tinsley, Kobel, and Fischberg, 1979
Family Ptychadenidae - sometimes considered part of the family Ranidae, see below; 29 species in 2 genera in the Democratic Republic of the Congo.
Hildebrandtia ornata (Peters, 1878)
Ptychadena aequiplicata (Werner, 1898)
Ptychadena anchietae (Bocage, 1868)
Ptychadena ansorgii (Boulenger, 1905)
Ptychadena bibroni (Hallowell, 1845)
Ptychadena bunoderma (Boulenger, 1907); presumably in (SW) DRC
Ptychadena christyi (Boulenger, 1919)
Ptychadena chrysogaster Laurent, 1954
Ptychadena grandisonae Laurent, 1954
Ptychadena guibei Laurent, 1954
Ptychadena hylaea Schmidt and Inger, 1959; possibly same as P. mascareniensis
Ptychadena ingeri Perret, 1991
Ptychadena keilingi (Monard, 1937)
Ptychadena mascareniensis (Duméril and Bibron, 1841)
Ptychadena nilotica (Seetzen, 1855); distinct from P. mascareniensis, possibly in (E) DRC
Ptychadena obscura (Schmidt and Inger, 1959)
Ptychadena oxyrhynchus (Smith, 1849)
Ptychadena perplicata Laurent, 1964; presumably in (S) DRC
Ptychadena perreti Guibé and Lamotte, 1958
Ptychadena porosissima (Steindachner, 1867)
Ptychadena pumilio (Boulenger, 1920)
Ptychadena schillukorum (Werner, 1908); probably in DRC
Ptychadena straeleni (Inger, 1968)
Ptychadena subpunctata (Bocage, 1866)
Ptychadena taenioscelis Laurent, 1954
Ptychadena tellinii (Peracca, 1904)
Ptychadena trinodis (Boettger, 1881)
Ptychadena upembae (Schmidt and Inger, 1959)
Ptychadena uzungwensis (Loveridge, 1932)
Family Pyxicephalidae - sometimes considered part of the family Ranidae, see below; 10 species in 5 genera in the Democratic Republic of the Congo.
Amietia amieti (Laurent, 1976)
Amietia angolensis (Bocage, 1866)
Amietia desaegeri (Laurent, 1972)
Amietia ruwenzorica (Laurent, 1972)
Amietia wittei (Angel, 1924)
Aubria masako Ohler and Kazadi, 1990; possibly indistinct from Aubria subsigillata
Cacosternum boettgeri (Boulenger, 1882); probably in DRC (highlands)
Cacosternum leleupi Laurent, 1950
Pyxicephalus adspersus Tschudi, 1838; probably in (S) DRC
Tomopterna tuberculosa (Boulenger, 1882)
Family Ranidae - True frogs, 6 species in 1 genus in the Democratic Republic of the Congo
Hylarana albolabris (Hallowell, 1856) = Amnirana albolabris
Hylarana amnicola Perret, 1977 = Amnirana amnicola, presumably in DRC
Hylarana darlingi (Boulenger, 1902) = Amnirana darlingi
Hylarana galamensis (Duméril and Bibron, 1841) = Amnirana galamensis
Hylarana lemairei (De Witte, 1921) = Amnirana lemairei
Hylarana lepus (Andersson, 1903) = Amnirana lepus
Family Rhacophoridae - Moss frogs, 2 species in 1 genus in the Democratic Republic of the Congo
Chiromantis rufescens (Günther, 1869)
Chiromantis xerampelina Peters, 1854; probably in (S) DRC

Order Caudata - Salamanders
There are no salamanders in the Democratic Republic of the Congo, nor in tropical Africa.

Order Gymnophiona - Caecilian
Total 3 species in 3 genera in 1 family, in the Democratic Republic of the Congo

Family Caeciliidae - Common caecilians, 3 species in 3 genera:
Boulengerula fischeri Nussbaum and Hinkel, 1994; possibly in (E) DRC
Geotrypetes seraphini (Duméril, 1859)
Herpele squalostoma (Stutchbury, 1836)

See also
 List of amphibians
 List of birds of the Democratic Republic of Congo
 List of mammals of the Democratic Republic of the Congo
 List of reptiles of the Democratic Republic of the Congo
 Lists of amphibians by region

Sources, external links 

Based on the following two sources:
Frost, Darrel R. 2013. Amphibian Species of the World: an Online Reference. Version 5.6 (2013). Electronic Database accessible at https://web.archive.org/web/20071024033938/http://research.amnh.org/herpetology/amphibia/index.php. American Museum of Natural History, New York, USA. See: Amphibian Species of the World
AmphibiaWeb

Amphibians

Congo
Democratic Republic of the Congo